Wamanripa (local name for Senecio or a species of it, also applied for Laccopetalum giganteum, Hispanicized spelling Huamanripa) is a   mountain in the Paryaqaqa mountain range in the Andes of Peru. It is situated in the Lima Region, Huarochirí Province, San Mateo District. Wamanripa lies northwest of Phaqcha and Uqsha Wallqa and northeast of Waqaypaka.

References 

Mountains of Peru
Mountains of Lima Region